The 5th Kure Special Naval Landing Force (5th Kure SNLF) was a naval infantry battalion of the Imperial Japanese Navy's Special Naval Landing Forces.

The unit was formed at the Kure Naval District on May 1st 1942, in anticipation for the Battle of Midway. Following the IJN's defeat at Midway, part of the 5th Kure SNLF participated as one of the main landing forces in battle of Milne Bay. The unit survived the battle, albeit with considerable casualties and was disbanded shortly afterwards.

Commanders
Commander Shojiro Hayashi

Citations

References

Military units and formations of Japan in World War II
Special Landing Forces of the Imperial Japanese Navy